Running With the Devil: The Wild World of John McAfee is a 2022 documentary film about John McAfee.

References

External links
IMDB

2022 films